Shamal is the center of Shamal District, Khost Province, Afghanistan. The town is located within the heartland of the Kharoti tribe of Pashtuns.

See also
 Khost Province

References

External links

Populated places in Khost Province